Renaissance is a mixed-use development designed by Assael Architecture and commissioned by Barratt Homes in Lewisham, Greater London comprising 788 flats in 10 buildings, retail units at ground level, a district heating centre and the Glass Mill leisure centre designed by LA Architects.

History
The development is located to the south of Loampit Vale, on the site of the former 1960s Sundermead Estate. Lewisham Council approved its demolition and redevelopment in 2009.

Development
The scheme has a complementary mix of uses. The residential buildings have Italian-inspired names: Torre Vista, Venice Corte, Sienna Alto, Da Vinci Torre, Rome/Roma Corte, Tuscany Corte, and Paris Corte.

Glass Mill Leisure Centre replaces Ladywell Leisure Centre.

References

Redevelopment projects in London
Geography of the London Borough of Lewisham

External links

www.renaissancese13.co.uk